Mustafa Afridi is a screenwriter and occasional actor from Pakistan, known for his television plays in Urdu television industry such as Aseerzadi, Sang-e-Mar Mar and Ehd-e-Wafa. For his serial Sang-e-Mar Mar, he has won Hum Award and Lux Style Award for Best Writer.

Early life and career
Afridi joined the industry as writer after getting education from National Academy of Arts. His first project as a writer was an episode named Mukti in PTV's Partition Stories. He aspired to become an actor but his teachers found him more suited for writing.

He also played the role of Azhar in Hum TV's pre-partition period play Aangan, for which he wrote the screenplay also.

Notable work

Awards and achievements
 Nominated Best Writer for Aseerzadi (2nd Hum Awards 2012)
 Best Writer for Sang-e-Mar Mar (5th Hum Awards 2017)
 Nominated Best Writer for Aangan (1st PISA 2020)

Lux Style Awards

References

External links 
 

Pakistani screenwriters
Lux Style Award winners

Year of birth missing (living people)
Living people